North Leeward Predators is a football club from Chateaubelair in St Vincent and the Grenadines. The club currently plays in the NLA Premier League.

History
Club was founded in 2007. Played in top division.

Squad

References

External links
 St. Vincent and the Grenadines Football Federation 

2007 establishments in Saint Vincent and the Grenadines
Football clubs in Saint Vincent and the Grenadines